Rock & Roll Machine (also Rock 'N' Roll Machine) is the second studio album by Canadian hard rock band Triumph. It was first released in 1977 by Attic Records. The album contained in the band's first hit, a version of Joe Walsh's "Rocky Mountain Way". 

A different "international" version of the album was released on RCA Records in the United States and other countries in 1978. This edition replaces some tracks from the original Canadian version with tracks from the self-titled debut Triumph (1976) album, along with new artwork. 

The album was released for a second time in Canada, with a different cover than the original one or the international one, using the re-sequenced tracks from the international version. The international version was re-issued in the US on MCA Records in 1985.

Track listing (Attic Records, Canada)
Side one

Side two

Track listing (International version)
The RCA and MCA re-sequenced track listing is as follows:

Side one
 "Takes Time" (Emmett, Moore, Levine) – 3:48
 "Bringing It On Home" (Emmett, Levine) – 4:35
 "Rocky Mountain Way" (Walsh, Vitale, Passarelli, Grace) – 4:04
 "Street Fighter" (Emmett, Moore) –  3:30
 "Street Fighter (Reprise)" (Emmett, Moore) –  3:02

Side two
 "24 Hours a Day" (Emmett) –  4:17
 "Blinding Light Show/Moonchild" (Emmett, Brockway, Young) –  8:43
 "Rock and Roll Machine" (Moore) – 6:53

Personnel 
 Rik Emmett – guitars, vocals
 Gil Moore – drums, vocals
 Michael Levine – bass, keyboards
 Laurie Delgrande – keyboards
 Mike Danna – keyboards
 Beau David – background vocals
 Elaine Overholt – background vocals
 Gord Waszek – background vocals
 Colina Phillips – background vocals
 Rosie Levine – background vocals

Production 
 Michael Levine – producer
 Mike Jones – engineer
 George Semkiw – remixing
 Doug Neil – assistant
 Hugh Cooper – assistant
 John Golden – digital mastering
 Brett Zilahi – digital remastering
 Rene Zamic – cover illustration
 Gary Kremnitz – photography
 Lynne Waggett – photography
 Jim Murray – photography
 Alan Henry – crew
 Dave Dickson – crew
 Peter Woods – crew

Charts

Certifications

Release history

External links
 Rock & Roll Machine entry at The Official Triumph Homepage

Triumph (band) albums
1977 albums
Concept albums
Albums produced by Mike Levine (musician)